Henriette Youanga (born 1 January 1958) is an archer from the Central African Republic.  She represented the Central African Republic in archery at the 2000 Summer Olympics in Sydney, Australia.

Olympic Games 

Youanga finished 63rd out of 64 in the ranking round.  She lost 166-126 to second seed Natalia Valeeva in the round of 64.

External links 

1958 births
Living people
Archers at the 2000 Summer Olympics
Central African Republic female archers
Olympic archers of the Central African Republic